Nord was an amateur ice hockey team in Donetsk, Ukraine. They participated in the Ukrainian Hockey Championship during the 1992–93 season. The team finished in fifth place in the first round with a record of one win and four losses, with 19 goals for and 37 against. They failed to qualify for the final round.

References

Ice hockey teams in Ukraine
Sport in Donetsk